Erin Corner is an unincorporated community located in the town of Erin Prairie, St. Croix County, Wisconsin, United States.

References

Unincorporated communities in St. Croix County, Wisconsin
Unincorporated communities in Wisconsin